The Master of the View of Saint Gudula (active 1480 – 1499), was an Early Netherlandish painter active in Brussels in the last quarter of the 15th century.

Biography
He was born in Brussels and is known for portraits of prominent church patrons and other religious works.	His work is sometimes confused with that of other Antwerp or Brussels painters of his day.

References

	
		
	
	

1480 births
1499 deaths
Early Netherlandish painters
Artists from Brussels
View of Saint Gudula